The Trigger Trio is a 1937 American Western "Three Mesquiteers" B-movie directed by William Witney.

Plot

Cast 
Ray Corrigan as Tucson Smith
Max Terhune as Lullaby Joslin
Ralph Byrd as Larry Smith (Tucson's brother)
Sandra Corday as Ann Evans
Robert Warwick as John Evans
Cornelius Keefe as Brent
Sammy McKim as Mickey Evans
Hal Taliaferro as Henchman Luke
Willie Fung as The cook
Buck as Buck

References

External links 
 
 

1937 Western (genre) films
1937 films
American black-and-white films
Films directed by William Witney
Republic Pictures films
Three Mesquiteers films
American Western (genre) films
Films produced by Sol C. Siegel
Films with screenplays by Joseph F. Poland
1930s English-language films
1930s American films